Schimmelfennig is a surname. Notable people with the surname include:

 Alexander Schimmelfennig (1824–1865), Prussian soldier and political revolutionary
 Frank Schimmelfennig (born 1963), German professor

German-language surnames